Robert Bergen (born March 8, 1964) is an American voice actor. He voices Warner Bros. cartoon characters Porky Pig and Tweety and has voiced characters in the English dubs of various anime. He formerly hosted the children's game show Jep!, adapted from the game show Jeopardy!.

Life and career
Bergen, in his childhood, watched the Daffy and Speedy cartoons in theaters and didn't like them, saying they didn't make sense. He then watched The Bugs Bunny / Road Runner Show in his later childhood.

As a teenager in 1980, Bergen appeared as a contestant on a Teen Week episode of Wheel of Fortune, winning prizes including a watch.

Bergen had taken acting lessons with Daws Butler at his weekly voice-over workshop.

Bergen is the current voice of the animated character Porky Pig, and has also voiced Tweety, Marvin the Martian, Sylvester Jr., and Speedy Gonzales.

Bergen is responsible for the voice of Arsène Lupin III for the Streamline Pictures dubs in the late 1980s and early 1990s: The Mystery of Mamo (directed by Sōji Yoshikawa), The Castle of Cagliostro (directed by Hayao Miyazaki) and Lupin III's Greatest Capers (two TV episodes from series two directed by Hayao Miyazaki). He also played the part of No-Face in the 2001 Academy Award-winning movie Spirited Away, one of the firefighters in The Incredibles, and Kai and Masaru in the Streamline-dubbed version of the anime classic Akira.

He is also responsible for the voice of Luke Skywalker in over a dozen Star Wars video games as well as the Robot Chicken episodes Episode I, II and III, the voice of Wembley and the World's Oldest Fraggle for the animated Fraggle Rock, was selected to play the animated versions of Dr. Bunsen Honeydew and Link Hogthrob in the ill-fated Little Muppet Monsters, and also voiced characters of the day in the 1987–89 seasons of Muppet Babies.

He appeared as himself in interview segments of the documentary I Know That Voice.

He also voiced Wind-Up in Skylanders: Swap Force, Skylanders: Trap Team and Skylanders: SuperChargers.

In 1998, Bergen hosted Jep!, the children's version of Jeopardy!, on Game Show Network. He has also appeared on the ABC game show To Tell the Truth.

Bergen is Jewish.

Filmography

Animation

Anime
Crimson Wolf — Kai
Megazone 23 — Shogo Yahagi (Streamline Pictures dub)
The Secret of Blue Water — Dr. Ayerton (original dub)
Tales of the Wolf — Arsène Lupin III/The Wolf
Teknoman — Blade/Teknoman
Spirited Away — No-Face (English dub)

Films

Direct-to-video films

Live-action
Army of Darkness — Various Creature voices
Dunston Checks In — Dunston's vocal effects
Fright Night Part 2 — Various Vampire and Creature vocal effects
Ghoulies III: Ghoulies Go to College — Rat Ghoulie (voice) 
Gremlins — Various Gremlins voices (credited as Bob Berger)
I Know That Voice — Himself
Jep! — Host 
Look Who's Talking Now — Additional Dogs and Wolves voices
Total Recall — Additional voices
The Santa Clause 2 — Comet the Reindeer
The Santa Clause 3: The Escape Clause — Comet the Reindeer
Hell's Kitchen — Himself

Video games
Bugs Bunny's Birthday Ball — Porky Pig, Tweety Bird
Boom Blox — Additional voices
Disney Universe — HEX
 Disney Sports Soccer — Sports Announcer
 Disney Sports Basketball — Sports Announcer
 Disney Sports Football — Sports Announcer
 Disney Sports Skateboarding — Sports Announcer
Escape From Monkey Island — Whipp the Lucre Lawyer
Infamous First Light — Additional voices
Looney Tunes: Cartoon Conductor – Porky Pig, Tweety Bird
Looney Tunes Racing — Porky Pig
Looney Tunes: Acme Arsenal — Porky Pig, Evil Porky, Dr. Frankenbeans
Looney Tunes: Back In Action — Porky Pig, Tweety Bird
Looney Tunes: World of Mayhem — Porky Pig, Tweety Bird, Sylvester Jr.
Looney Tunes: Space Race — Porky Pig
Scooby-Doo and Looney Tunes: Cartoon Universe — Porky Pig, Tweety Bird
Sheep Raider — Porky Pig
Skylanders: SuperChargers — Wind-Up
Skylanders: Swap Force — Wind-Up
Skylanders: Trap Team — Wind-Up
Star Wars: Battlefront II — Luke Skywalker
Star Wars: Episode I: Racer — Clegg Holdfast, Jinn Resso, Wan Sandago, Cy Yanga, Gasgano
Star Wars: Episode I – The Phantom Menace — Alien Pedestrian, Coruscant Thug #3, EV-7G, Gungan Citizen #2
Star Wars: Force Commander — Coruscant Palace Guard, Luke Skywalker
Star Wars: Galactic Battlegrounds — Luke Skywalker, Reytha Soldier
Star Wars: Jedi Knight: Jedi Academy — Luke Skywalker, Saboteur 2
Star Wars Jedi Knight II: Jedi Outcast — Luke Skywalker
Star Wars: Masters of Teräs Käsi — Luke Skywalker
Star Wars: Racer Revenge — Ody Mandrell, Gasgano
Star Wars: Rebellion — Luke Skywalker
Star Wars: Rogue Squadron — Luke Skywalker
Star Wars Rogue Squadron II: Rogue Leader — Luke Skywalker
Star Wars Rogue Squadron III: Rebel Strike — Luke Skywalker
Star Wars: Shadows of the Empire — Luke Skywalker (PC version)
Star Wars: The Old Republic — Additional voices
Star Wars: X-Wing Alliance — Luke Skywalker, Civilian Officer
Star Wars: X-Wing vs. TIE Fighter — Rebel Pilot #5
Sylvester and Tweety in Cagey Capers — Tweety Bird
The Junkyard Run — Porky Pig

Shorts
Carrotblanca — Tweety
My Generation G...G...Gap — Additional voices

Awards and nominations

References

External links

 
 Bob Bergen  at Voice Chasers
 
 Toon Zone News interview with Bob Bergen ("A Life in Voice Acting")
 

1964 births
Living people
20th-century American male actors
21st-century American male actors
American game show hosts
American male video game actors
American male voice actors
Male actors from St. Louis
Jewish American male actors